Events from the year 1984 in Denmark.

Incumbents
 Monarch - Margrethe II
 Prime minister - Poul Schlüter

Events

Undated

Sports
 28 – 12 July August – Denmark at the 1984 Summer Olympics in Los Angeles: 0 gold medals, 3 silver medals and 3 bronze medals.

Badminton
 25 March  Morten Frost wins gold in men's suingle at the 1984 All England Open Badminton Championships.
 8–14 April – With one gold medal, three silver medals and 2 bronze medals, Denmark finishes as the second best nation at the 9th European Badminton Championships in Preston, England.
 Gentofte BK wins silver at Europe Cup.

Cycling
 Albert Fritz (FRG) and Dietrich Thurau (FRG) win the Six Days of Copenhagen sox-day track cycling race.
 April – Kim Andersen wins La Flèche Wallonne.
 Unknown date  Hans-Henrik Ørsted wins gold in Men's individual pursuit at the 1984 UCI Track Cycling World Championships.

Football
 12–27 June – Denmark national football team participates at UEFA Euro 1984 in France.
 19 June – Denmark qualifies for the semi-finals by defeating Belgium 3–2 in their last game in Group A and thereby finishing second in the group after France.
 24 June – Denmark faces Spain in the semi-final and leads for most of the match after an early goal by Søren Lerby but Antonio Maceda scores three minutes before time and Denmark is subsequently defeated 6–4 after a penalty shoot-out..

Births
 22 March – Annika Langvad, cyclist
 13 April – Anders Lindegaard, footballer
 1 May – Mikkel Følsgaard, actor
 3 November – Christian Bakkerud, Danish racing driver (d. 2011) 
 2 December – Anna David, singer
 12 December – Daniel Agger, football player

Deaths
 16 April – Simon Spies, businessman and billionaire (dorn 1921)
 21 May – Carl Petersen, politician (born 1894)
 22 December - Vilhelm Lauritzen, architect (born 1894)

See also
1984 in Danish television

References

 
Denmark
Years of the 20th century in Denmark
1980s in Denmark